"Born in the Dark" is a song written by Chet Hinesley, and recorded by American country music artist Doug Stone.  It was released in September 1995 as the third single from his album Faith in Me, Faith in You.  The song reached number 12 on the Billboard Hot Country Singles & Tracks chart in January 1996.

Chart performance

References

1995 singles
Doug Stone songs
Columbia Records singles
Song recordings produced by James Stroud
1995 songs